Although the subsoil of Ivory Coast contained many other minerals, none existed in commercially exploitable amounts, given the high costs of extraction. Mining contributed only 1 percent of GDP in 1986.

During the precolonial era, gold was extracted from small shafts dug into the earth or from river and streambeds and was traded at the coast or across the Sahara Desert. Efforts under the colonial administration to exploit gold deposits at Kokoumbo in the center of the country and at small mines in the southeast proved unprofitable. In 1984 the state-owned SODEMI and a French mining company formed the Ity Mining Company (Société Minières d'Ity—SMI) to exploit a deposit discovered thirty years earlier at Ity near Danané. Total investment in this period was estimated at CFA F1.2 billion. The gold ore was of medium quality, with a ratio of gold to ore in the range of 8.5 grams per ton. Extraction was to begin in 1987, with output anticipated at 700 kilograms of gold metal during the first two years of operation. Ity estimated an additional investment of CFA F2.3 billion to expand output to 700 kilograms of gold metal a year. SODEMI also located gold deposits in the region of Issia and in the Lobo River bed, with anticipated annual yields of 100 kilograms and 25 kilograms, respectively.

In the mid-1970s, low-grade deposits (less than 50 percent) of iron ore estimated at 585 million tons were assayed at Bangolo near the Liberian border. A consortium representing Japanese, French, British, American, Dutch, and Ivoirian interests was formed to exploit the deposits; however, depressed world prices for iron ore forced the participants to postpone the project indefinitely.

Following World War II, diamond mining seemed promising, but by the mid-1980s expectations had waned. The Tortiya diamond mine, operating since 1948, peaked in 1972 when  were mined. In 1980, however, the mine was closed.

Between 1960 and 1966, manganese mines in the region of Grand-Lahou on the coast yielded 180,000 tons of ore per year. In 1970, after world market prices had dropped and production costs had risen, the mines were closed. There were additional unexploited manganese deposits near Odienné. Ivory Coast also had small deposits of colombo-tantalite, ilmenite, cobalt, copper, nickel, and bauxite.

References

External links
 La Mancha - Ity Mine

Mining in Ivory Coast
Economy of Ivory Coast
Ivory Coast